Noureddine Erray (born 1970) is a Tunisian politician. He served as Minister of Foreign Affairs from 27 February 2020 to 24 July 2020.

References 

Living people
1970 births
Place of birth missing (living people)
21st-century Tunisian politicians
Government ministers of Tunisia
Foreign ministers of Tunisia